Established in 1995, Great Big Events is an international Sport Presentation and Event Management company with offices in Sydney (Australia), London (United Kingdom) and Doha (Qatar) with satellite offices around North America, Europe, Gulf Region and Australasia. The company predominantly works with international sporting events as well as cultural, public and government events. Amongst its many notable sporting achievements, the company has produced the Sydney 2000, Beijing 2008 and London 2012 Olympic and Paralympic Games, the Australia 2003, France 2007 and New Zealand 2011 Rugby World Cups, the Manchester 2002, Melbourne 2006, Glasgow 2014 Commonwealth Games, 2015 Toronto Pan American Games and the 2015 Baku 1st European Games. GBE have partnered with a number of International Federations to create Sport Presentation guidelines and templates. 

Great Big Events has been responsible for sport presentation in more than 55 sports at an international level. 
 2018 Gold Coast Commonwealth Games (Pre-Production) 
 2017 Budapest FINA World Championships
 2015 Toronto Pan American Games 
 2015 Baku European Games 
 2014 Doha FINA Swimming Championships (25m) 
 2014 Glasgow Commonwealth Games
 2012 London Olympic and Paralympic Games
 2011 Rugby World Cup New Zealand
 2008 Beijing Olympic and Paralympic Games
 2008 Manchester FINA Swimming Championships (25m) 
 2007 Rugby World Cup France
 2007 Melbourne FINA World Championships
 2006 Doha Asian Games
 2006 Melbourne Commonwealth Games
 2006 Eton Rowing Championships
 2005 Doha West Asian Games
 2005 Montreal FINA World Championships
 2004 World Track Cycling Championships
 2003 Rugby World Cup Australia
 2002 Manchester Commonwealth Games
 2001 Brisbane Goodwill Games
 2001, 2003, 2005, 2007 Australian Youth Olympic Festival
 2000 Sydney Olympic and Paralympic Games

References

 http://apraamcos.com.au/news/2015/march/great-big-events/
 https://books.google.com.au/books?id=8iziBAAAQBAJ&pg=PA578&lpg=PA578&dq=Great+Big+Events
 http://www.smartcompany.com.au/growth/export/australians-play-the-game-behind-the-scenes-at-the-beijing-olympics/
 https://www.thestar.com/news/gta/panamgames/2015/07/17/music-sets-mood-at-the-pan-am-games.html
 http://www.theroar.com.au/2015/08/13/arus-new-logo-atmosphere-r-us-dw/
 http://www.fina.org/content/fwac-2014-greg-bowman

External links 
 Great Big Events

Sports event promotion companies